Cosas de Enamorados (Love Things) is the seventeenth studio album by Juan Gabriel, released in 1982.

Track listing

References 

Juan Gabriel albums
1982 albums
Ariola Records albums